The Army of West Virginia served in the Union Army during the American Civil War and was the primary field army of the Department of West Virginia. It campaigned primarily in West Virginia, Southwest Virginia and in the Shenandoah Valley. It is noted for having two future U.S. presidents serve in its ranks: Rutherford B. Hayes and William McKinley, both from the 23rd Ohio Infantry. With fighting in the Valley ended, the Army of West Virginia's designation was discontinued.

History
 Brigadier General George Crook was appointed to command the Department of West Virginia on July 25, 1864. Crook did not immediately assume this command and in the meantime was in command of the Army of the Kanawha. When Crook assumed command on August 9, 1864, the army in the field was given the title "Army of West Virginia". The army consisted of three divisions and for all practical purposes functioned as a corps in Maj. Gen. Philip Sheridan's Army of the Shenandoah. Often this command has been referred to as the VIII Corps. It should not be confused with the official Union Army VIII Corps, which was commanded by Maj. Gen. Lew Wallace and on guard duty along the B & O Railroad during this time. Crook led the army through the Shenandoah Valley Campaign and fought in all the major engagements.

The 1st Division was led by Col. Joseph Thoburn until he was killed in action at Cedar Creek. He was succeeded by Col. Thomas M. Harris. The 2nd "Kanawha" Division was led by Col. Isaac H. Duval until he was wounded at Third Winchester. Command of the division passed to Col. Rutherford B. Hayes who led the division at Cedar Creek. A Provisional Division led by Colonel J. Howard Kitching joined just prior to the battle of Cedar Creek. Exact composition of the Provisional Division is unknown other than approximately 1,000 soldiers including the 6th New York Heavy Artillery. Kitching was severely wounded at Cedar Creek and died the following year as a result. His place was taken by Col. Wilhelm Heine.

On December 19, 1864, with the fighting in the Valley over, the official designation as "Army of West Virginia" was discontinued but Crook retained command of the Department of West Virginia.  Hayes' division remained in the Department of West Virginia while Thoburn's (Harris') and Kitching's (Heine's) divisions were transferred to the Army of the James.

Commander
 Major General Franz Sigel
 Major General David Hunter  (21 May–8 Aug 1864)
 Major General George Crook  (8 Aug–19 Dec 1864)

Major battles
 Battle of Cloyd's Mountain
 Battle of New Market
 Battle of Piedmont
 Battle of Lynchburg
 Battle of Cool Spring
 Battle of Rutherford's Farm
 Second Battle of Kernstown
 Battle of Berryville
 Battle of Opequon
 Battle of Fisher's Hill
 Battle of Cedar Creek

References

 Civil War Home

West Virginia, Army of
West Virginia in the American Civil War
1864 establishments in West Virginia
Military units and formations established in 1864
Military units and formations disestablished in 1864